Sarah Blanck (born 18 January 1977 in Melbourne) is an Australian sailor .

In 2002, she won the Olympic class Europe World Championships.

Blanck won the ISAF Youth World Championship in 1995 and the Laser Radial Women's World Championships in 1997. A member of the Royal Brighton Yacht Club, she has represented Australia at both the 2004 and the 2008 Olympics, sailing the women's singlehanded dinghy, the Laser Radial. In both Games she finished fourth. She was an Australian Institute of Sport scholarship holder.

Blanck attended Luther College during her high school years.

References

External links

1977 births
Living people
Australian female sailors (sport)
Laser Radial class world champions
World champions in sailing for Australia
Olympic sailors of Australia
Sailors at the 2004 Summer Olympics – Europe
Sailors at the 2008 Summer Olympics – Laser Radial
Australian Institute of Sport sailors
21st-century Australian women